Debne is a town in central Djibouti located in Tadjoura. It sprawls on a wide basin surrounded by granitic mountains on all sides.

Climate
Debne has a hot semi-arid climate (BSh) in Köppen-Geiger system.

Populated places in Djibouti
Tadjourah Region